Arsène Elogo Guintangui (born 22 April 1995) is a Cameroonian professional footballer who plays for French  club Le Puy as a midfielder.

Career
Elogo was a youth product of Grenoble before moving briefly to Saint-Étienne in 2012, and returned to Grenoble in 2015. He made his professional debut with Grenoble in a 2–1 Coupe de la Ligue loss to FC Metz on 14 August 2018.

On 16 June 2022, Elogo signed with Le Puy.

References

External links

 
 

1995 births
Living people
Cameroonian footballers
Association football midfielders
Grenoble Foot 38 players
Valenciennes FC players
Le Puy Foot 43 Auvergne players
Ligue 2 players
Championnat National players
Championnat National 2 players
Championnat National 3 players
Cameroonian expatriate footballers
Cameroonian expatriate sportspeople in France
Expatriate footballers in France